Coleman fuel, also generically sold as white gas, is a petroleum naphtha product marketed by the Coleman Company.

Contents
Historically called white gas, it is a liquid petroleum fuel (100% light hydrotreated distillate), composed of cyclohexane, nonane, octane, heptane, and pentane. White gas was originally simply additive-free gasoline.  This formulation is now rarely found.  Coleman fuel, and its white gas copies, contain additives for inhibiting rust, ease of lighting, and fast burning.  It is also cleaner than the original white gas.

Use
Coleman fuel is used primarily for fueling lanterns and camp stoves. It is usually sold in one-gallon cans in the United States; in Europe it is usually sold in one-litre bottles.

Additionally, it is a popular fuel for fire dancing. Originally, it was simply casing-head gas or drip gas, which has similar properties. Drip gas was sold commercially at gas stations and hardware stores in North America until the early 1950s. The white gas sold today is a similar product but is produced at refineries and has a very low benzene content, benzene being a human carcinogen.

Though Coleman fuel has an octane rating of 50 to 55 and a flammability similar to gasoline, it has none of the additives found in modern gasoline. Most burners will readily burn unleaded gasoline as a substitute fuel.

See also
Naphtha
Drip gas

References

Liquid fuels